This is a list of Fellows of the Royal Society elected in 1713.

Fellows
 Louis D'Aumont de Rochebaron (1667–1723)
 Giovanni Antonio, Count Baldini (1654–1725)
 Richard Barrett (fl. 1713)
 Francesco Bianchini (1662–1729)
 John Colson (1680–1760)
 John Inglis (d. 1740)
 Daniel Ernest Jablonski (1660–1741)
 Von Kreienberg (d. 1743)
 Cotton Mather (1663–1728)
 Pierre de Mellarede (c. 1659–1730)
 Charles Oliphant (c. 1666–1720)
 John Poulett, 1st Earl Poulett (1668–1743)
 Iver Rosenkrantz (1674–1745)
 Henry St. John, Viscount Bolingbroke (1678–1751)
 George Tollet (c. 1684–1714)

References

1713
1713 in science
1713 in England